Chora Island Wildlife Refuge, is a protected area in Costa Rica, managed under the Tempisque Conservation Area, it was created in 2002 by decree 30719-MINAE.

References 

Nature reserves in Costa Rica
Protected areas established in 2002